His Excellency is a 1950 play by the British writers Campbell Christie and Dorothy Christie. A former docker takes over as the British governor of an island colony in the Mediterranean.

It premiered at the Grand Theatre, Leeds before transferring to the West End where it ran for 453 performances between 23 May 1950 and 23 June 1951 initially at the Princes Theatre before moving to the Piccadilly Theatre. The play starred Eric Portman later replaced by Donald Wolfit in the title role, Clive Morton, John Wood, Ian Fleming, Arnold Bell, Sebastian Shaw, Michael Shepley and Annabel Maule.

Adaptation
In 1952 it was adapted into a film of the same title directed by Robert Hamer with Portman reprising his role and a cast that also included Cecil Parker and Susan Stephen.

References

Bibliography
 Goble, Alan. The Complete Index to Literary Sources in Film. Walter de Gruyter, 1999.
 Wearing, J.P. The London Stage 1950-1959: A Calendar of Productions, Performers, and Personnel.  Rowman & Littlefield, 2014.

1950 plays
West End plays
British plays adapted into films